Gatton was a parliamentary borough in Surrey, one of the most notorious of all the rotten boroughs. It elected two Members of Parliament (MPs) to the House of Commons from 1450 until 1832, when the constituency was abolished by the Great Reform Act. Around the time of that Act it was often held up by reformers as the epitome of what was wrong with the unreformed system.

History
The borough consisted of part of the parish of Gatton, near Reigate,  between London and Brighton. It included the manor and estate of Gatton Park. Gatton was no more than a village, with a population in 1831 of 146, and 23 houses of which as few as six may have been within the borough.

The right to vote was extended to all freeholders and inhabitants paying scot and lot; but this apparently wide franchise was normally meaningless in tiny Gatton: there were only 7 qualified voters in 1831, and the number had sometimes fallen as low as two. This position had existed long before the 19th century: Gatton was one of the first of the English boroughs to come under the total dominance of a "patron": in the reign of Henry VIII, when Gatton's representation was only a century old, Sir Roger Copley described himself as "its burgess and only inhabitant". In these circumstances, the local landowners had no difficulty in maintaining absolute control, and for most of the 16th century it was the Copleys who held this power. However, the Copleys were Roman Catholics, and this caused difficulties in the later Elizabethan period: the head of the family, Thomas Copley, went into voluntary exile abroad, and when his wife and child returned to England after his death she was soon caught harbouring a Catholic priest. The Sheriff and Deputy Lieutenants of Surrey were directed by the Privy Council to ensure that Gatton made its choice free from any influence by Mrs Copley; the sheriff's precept for the election was directed not to the Lord of the Manor but to the parish constable; and it seems that between 1584 and 1621 the humble villagers of Gatton may have genuinely elected their MPs in their own right.

In the 1750s, Sir James Colebrooke (Lord of the Manor of Gatton) nominated for one seat and the Rev John Tattersall (Lord of the Manor of nearby Upper Gatton) the other. In 1774, Sir William Mayne (later Lord Newhaven) bought both manors and therefore control of both seats; from 1786 onwards they changed hands several times more, ending in the hands of Sir Mark Wood by the turn of the century. The borough was sold again in 1830, at a reported price of £180,000, despite the prospect of disenfranchisement; in the same year, while the ownership of the borough was under the administration of a broker, one of its seats in the new Parliament was sold for £1,200.

The small edifice, known as the town hall, where the elections are said to have taken place can still be seen today. Most of the site of the former constituency is now occupied by The Royal Alexandra and Albert School.

Contested election

Even though Gatton elections were entirely in the hands of the Lord of the Manor, there was a contested by-election on 24 January 1803. James Dashwood, one of the sitting members, was persuaded to resign to allow Philip Dundas (nephew of Pitt's ally Henry Dundas) to take a seat in Parliament. However, Joseph Clayton Jennings, a barrister who supported Parliamentary reform, arrived to contest the election together with a group of radical supporters. Jennings obtained one vote from a man claiming to be entitled to vote, but Dashwood (the returning officer) rejected it; hence Dundas was returned by 1 vote to nil.

A garbled version of the 1803 by-election was included by Henry Stooks Smith in The Parliaments of England from 1715 to 1847, as the supposed story of a by-election in 1816, at which Sir Mark Wood, 2nd Baronet was returned. Stooks Smith wrote:

The History of Parliament notes that this story "has not been confirmed". Gatton's representation was abolished by the Reform Act in 1832.

Members of Parliament

1510–1640

1640–1832

Notes

References 
Robert Beatson, A Chronological Register of Both Houses of Parliament (London: Longman, Hurst, Res & Orme, 1807) 
 Michael Brock, The Great Reform Act (London: Hutchinson, 1973) 
D Brunton & D H Pennington, Members of the Long Parliament (London: George Allen & Unwin, 1954)
Cobbett's Parliamentary history of England, from the Norman Conquest in 1066 to the year 1803 (London: Thomas Hansard, 1808) 
 J E Neale, The Elizabethan House of Commons (London: Jonathan Cape, 1949)
 J Holladay Philbin, Parliamentary Representation 1832 - England and Wales (New Haven: Yale University Press, 1965)
 Edward Porritt and Annie G Porritt, The Unreformed House of Commons (Cambridge University Press, 1903)
Henry Stooks Smith, The Parliaments of England from 1715 to 1847 (2nd edition, edited by FWS Craig - Chichester: Parliamentary Reference Publications, 1973)

Parliamentary constituencies in South East England (historic)
Constituencies of the Parliament of the United Kingdom established in 1450
Constituencies of the Parliament of the United Kingdom disestablished in 1832
Rotten boroughs